Albizia leonardii is a species of plant in the family Fabaceae. The tree is endemic to Haiti, on the Caribbean island of Hispaniola. It is rated as Critically Endangered on the IUCN Red List.

References

leonardii
Endemic flora of Haiti
Trees of Haiti
Taxonomy articles created by Polbot